Albert William Wallace Cuthbertson (4 November 1909 – 13 February 1977) was a yachtsman from New Zealand. He competed for New Zealand at the 1956 Summer Olympics in Melbourne, coming 11th in the three-man Dragon class, with Robert Stewart and William Swinnerton.

References

Sources
 Black Gold by Ron Palenski (2008, 2004 New Zealand Sports Hall of Fame, Dunedin) p. 32

External links 
 
 
  (archive)

1909 births
1977 deaths
New Zealand male sailors (sport)
Olympic sailors of New Zealand
Sailors at the 1956 Summer Olympics – Dragon